The men's 5000 metres event at the 2007 Asian Athletics Championships was held in Amman, Jordan on July 29.

Results

References
Final results

5000
5000 metres at the Asian Athletics Championships